Ischnarctia oberthueri is a moth of the subfamily Arctiinae. It is found in Angola.

References

 Natural History Museum Lepidoptera generic names catalog

Endemic fauna of Angola
Nyctemerina
Moths described in 1910